Mohamed Faraj Al-Kaabi (born 31 December 1984 in Qatar) is a male hammer thrower from Qatar. His personal best throw is 70.87 metres, achieved in April 2003 in Doha. This is the Qatari record.

Achievements

References

1984 births
Living people
Qatari male hammer throwers
Athletes (track and field) at the 2006 Asian Games
Athletes (track and field) at the 2010 Asian Games
Asian Games competitors for Qatar